() is a gender-neutral personal pronoun in Swedish intended as an alternative to the gender-specific  ("she") and  ("he"). It can be used when the gender of a person is not known or when it is not desirable to specify them as either a "she" or "he". The word was first proposed in 1966, and again in 1994, with reference to the Finnish , a personal pronoun that is gender-neutral, since Finnish does not have grammatical genders. However, it did not receive widespread recognition until around 2010, when it began to be used in some books, magazines and newspapers, and provoked media debates and controversy over feminism, gender neutrality, and parenting. In July 2014, it was announced that  would be included in Svenska Akademiens ordlista, the official spelling dictionary of the Swedish Academy. In April 2015, the gender neutral pronoun hen and 13,000 other new words were added in a new official dictionary of the Swedish language. Today, some believe the word has lost some of its feminist-activist connotation in Sweden as it is used in the media, court rulings and books.

Initially, it was treated as a neologism and faced opposition by some, including the major newspaper Dagens Nyheter that banned it in 2012, but later started using the pronoun.

Linguistic background 
The Swedish language has a set of personal pronouns which is more or less identical in form to that of English. While Swedish and Danish historically had the same set of three grammatical genders as modern German, with masculine, feminine and neuter, the three-gender system fell out of use from the dialects out of which the respective standard languages were developing sometime in the late Middle Ages. The system contracted so that words of masculine and feminine gender folded into a common gender while the neuter gender remained. Both are gender-neutral in the sense of not referring to male or female, but they are not used to refer to human beings except in specific circumstances.

History of usage
Attempts to introduce  as a gender-neutral pronoun date back to 1966 when linguist Rolf Dunås suggested it in the regional newspaper Upsala Nya Tidning. In 1994, it was again proposed by linguist Hans Karlgren in the national newspaper Svenska Dagbladet as a practical alternative to more complicated literary alternatives, noting its similarity to Finnish .

In January 2012, the children's book  ("Kivi and Monster Dog") by Jesper Lundqvist was published. In the February 2012 issue of Nöjesguiden, a Stockholm-based arts and entertainment monthly,  was used consistently in all texts with the exception of direct quotes. By late 2012, the word had generated so much publicity that Hufvudstadsbladet, Finland's largest Swedish-language newspaper by circulation, declared that "hen is here to stay".

His conclusion was that use among bloggers had been rising steadily from 2009 to 2012 and that it should be considered as an established word. However,  accounted for just 0.001% of total usage of personal pronouns.

The airline Norwegian employed the term in an ad campaign in 2012 as a tongue-in-cheek provocation with the slogan "The businessHEN's airline". By late 2012,  began to see use in official documents in some government agencies. The Court of Appeal for Lower Norrland applied the term in a ruling on official misconduct by a police officer.

 appeared in an official political context for the first time in February 2013 when Swedish Minister for Gender Equality Maria Arnholm used it in a debate in the Riksdag, the Swedish parliament. In commenting on the debate afterwards, Arnholm described the word as "a practical way of simplifying" and "a smart way of developing language". By 2013, Boden Municipality had adopted manuals of style to be used by their employees in an official context where  was recommended "to avoid repetition of he/she in texts where sex is unclear or where we wish to include both sexes".

By early 2014,  had become an established term both in traditional media and among bloggers. In late July 2014, the Swedish Academy announced that in April 2015,  would be included in Svenska Akademiens ordlista, the most authoritative spelling dictionary on the Swedish language. Its entry will cover two definitions: as a reference to individuals belonging to a specified sex or third gender, or where the sex is not known. In May 2015,  was introduced in legal text (the driver's license law), in the self-ruling area Åland, a part of Finland which is officially Swedish-speaking.

Recommendations
While the Swedish Language Council, the primary regulatory body of the Swedish language, suggests  as one of several gender-neutral constructions, the word is not necessarily recommended above the alternatives. Rather, the Council advises the reader to use whichever construction is more contextually apt, considering the target audience. Alternatives to  include , equivalent to English it; rewriting as plural, which is ungendered in Swedish much like in English; repeating the noun instead of using a pronoun or using  ("he or she"). "her(s)/his").

A handful of other authorities, such as the Equality Ombudsman and the National Financial Management Authority, use the pronoun routinely.

Debate
From an early stage,  has generated controversy and reactions in media. In 2010, the early use of the word prompted reactions of ridicule and skepticism.

An employee at Dagens Nyheter reacted by filing a complaint to the police against dhen.se for violating Swedish copyright law, but later retracted his accusation when the newspaper's management proved unwilling to pursue legal action.

The most controversial aspect of the use of  has been vis-à-vis young children, especially in public schools. This policy sparked debate and controversy in Sweden and received widespread attention in international media in 2011–2012.

See also

Spivak pronoun
Gender-neutral language
Gender-neutral pronoun
Pronoun game
Feminist language planning
Lavender linguistics

Notes

References
 Pettersson, Gertrud (1996) Svenska språket under sjuhundra år: en historia om svenskan och dess utforskande. Studentlitteratur, Lund. , 

1960s neologisms
Gender-neutral pronouns
Language policy in Sweden
Swedish language